Heberlein is a surname. Notable people with the surname include:

Ann Heberlein (born 1970), Swedish academic and author
Heinrich Th. Heberlein Jr. (1843–1910), German violin maker
Trix Heberlein (born 1942), Swiss politician

See also
Heberlein brake